Miva may refer to:

 Miva (company), a provider of ecommerce software
 MIVA Script, a computer scripting language
 Miva, Queensland, a place in Australia
 Midwest Intercollegiate Volleyball Association, an American collegiate club men's volleyball sports league
 Midwestern Intercollegiate Volleyball Association, an American college athletic conference

See also

Mivar, an Italian company